Juma Abdallah Njwayo (born 10 March 1964) is a Tanzanian CCM politician and Member of Parliament for Tandahimba constituency since 2005.

References

1964 births
Living people
Chama Cha Mapinduzi MPs
Tanzanian MPs 2005–2010
Tanzanian MPs 2010–2015
Ndanda Secondary School alumni
Open University of Tanzania alumni
University of Dar es Salaam alumni